Scud Rock is an isolated rock lying 4 nautical miles (7 km) south of Moody Point, the east extremity of Joinville Island. Roughly surveyed by the Falkland Islands Dependencies Survey (FIDS) in 1953. So named by the United Kingdom Antarctic Place-Names Committee (UK-APC) because scud (low, fast moving cloud) is characteristic of this area.

Rock formations of the Joinville Island group